Marcel Victor Felix Grosdidier de Matons (9 October 1885 – 2 December 1945) was a French historian.

Life 
Born in Paris, de Matons has written numerous books on the history of Lorraine, and was rewarded with the Montyon Prize by the Académie française.

Matons died in Paramé (Ille-et-Vilaine) at age 60.

Publications 
 Le Comté de Bar des origines au Traité de Bruges vers 950-1301.  
 Le mystère de Jeanne d'Arc.  (Montyon Prize, 1937)
 Les villes d'art célèbres: Metz, illustrated book with 80 rotogravures, Librairie Renouard, H. Laurens, publisher, 1957
 Nouveau Guide de Metz
 En Lorraine
 En Lorraine: au cœur de la Lorraine. (Prix Erckmann-Chatrian, 1937)
 En Lorraine: de l'Argonne aux Vosges.

References

External links 
 Le comté de Bar des origines au traité de Bruges (vers 950-1301) on Persée

1885 births
1945 deaths
Writers from Paris
20th-century French writers
20th-century French historians
Chevaliers of the Légion d'honneur